The 2022 Tennis in the Land event was a professional women's tennis tournament played on outdoor hard courts at Jacobs Pavilion. It was the second edition of the tournament held in the city of Cleveland, Ohio and was a part of the WTA 250 category of the 2022 WTA Tour.

Champions

Singles 

  Liudmila Samsonova def.  Aliaksandra Sasnovich 6–1, 6–3

This is Samsonova's second title of the year and third of her career.

Doubles 

  Nicole Melichar-Martinez /  Ellen Perez def.  Anna Danilina /  Aleksandra Krunić 7–5, 6–3

Points and prize money

Point distribution

Prize money 

1Qualifiers prize money is also the Round of 32 prize money.
*per team

Singles main-draw entrants

Seeds

 Rankings are as of August 15, 2022.

Other entrants
The following players received wildcards into the main draw:
  Lauren Davis
  Sofia Kenin
  Barbora Krejčíková
  Peyton Stearns

The following players received entry from the qualifying draw:
  Dalayna Hewitt
  Eri Hozumi
  Laura Siegemund
  Harmony Tan

The following players received entry as lucky losers:
  Francesca Di Lorenzo
  Iryna Shymanovich
  Marcela Zacarías

Withdrawals
Before the tournament
  Caroline Garcia → replaced by  Iryna Shymanovich
  Camila Giorgi → replaced by  Magda Linette
  Kaia Kanepi → replaced by  Aleksandra Krunić
  Ann Li → replaced by  Camila Osorio
  Elise Mertens → replaced by  Marcela Zacarías
  Anastasia Potapova → replaced by  Francesca Di Lorenzo
  Shelby Rogers → replaced by  Dayana Yastremska

Doubles main-draw entrants

Seeds

Rankings are as of August 15, 2022.

Other entrants
The following pairs received wildcards into the doubles main draw:
  Francesca Di Lorenzo  /  Marcela Zacarías
  Dalayna Hewitt /  Peyton Stearns

Withdrawals
Before the tournament
  Alexa Guarachi /  Andreja Klepač → replaced by  Elixane Lechemia /  Julia Lohoff
  Eri Hozumi /  Makoto Ninomiya → replaced by  Han Xinyun /  Eri Hozumi
  Anastasia Potapova /  Yana Sizikova → replaced by  Mayar Sherif /  Yana Sizikova
  Xu Yifan /  Yang Zhaoxuan → replaced by  Ingrid Gamarra Martins /  Emily Webley-Smith

References

External links 
 Official WTA tournament profile
 Official website

Tennis in the Land
Tennis in the Land
Tennis in the Land
Tennis in the Land
Sports competitions in Cleveland
Tennis in the Land
2020s in Cleveland
Tennis in Cleveland